Sofia Araújo (born 30 November 1994) is a Portuguese former professional tennis playerand currently a professional padel player.

On 18 October 2010, Araújo reached her best singles ranking of world number 926. On 27 May 2013, she peaked at world number 904 in the doubles rankings.

In April 2013, Araújo made her WTA tour debut at the 2013 Portugal Open playing alongside Joana Valle Costa in doubles, but lost to Nina Bratchikova and Varvara Lepchenko in the first round.

References

External links 
 
 

1994 births
Living people
Portuguese female tennis players
Female tennis players playing padel
Sportspeople from Lisbon
21st-century Portuguese women